The Hewett Treaty, also called the Treaty of Adwa, was an agreement between Britain, Egypt and Ethiopia signed at Adwa on 3 June 1884. The treaty ended a long-simmering conflict between Egypt and Ethiopia, but indirectly started a new conflict between Ethiopia and Italy. It had seven articles.

The terms of the treaty were negotiated at Asmara, in the northern reaches of the Ethiopian empire, by Mason Bey for Egypt, Admiral William Hewett for Britain and Ras Alula, also acting as host, for Ethiopia. Once terms had been agreed, the party moved to Adwa, where the treaty was presented to Emperor Yohannes IV of Ethiopia. The emperor demanded a seaport for Ethiopia, but later compromised. The final treaty represented a triumph of Anglo-Egyptian interests.

The first article of the treaty provided that Ethiopia would have free transit for all goods, including arms, through the port of Massawa. Britain undertook to protect this right. In the second article, Egypt returned Bogos, occupied since 1868, to Ethiopian control. In the third article, Ethiopia agreed to assist the evacuation of Egyptian troops from Kassala, Amadid and Senhit. In the fourth article, Egypt agreed to permit the passage of newly-appointed Abunas to Ethiopia. In the fifth article, Egypt and Ethiopia agreed to the extradition of criminals. In the sixth article, Ethiopia agreed to accept British arbitration in any case of disagreement with Egypt over the terms of the treaty.

Shortly after its ratification, the Italians occupied Massawa, which had been evacuated by Egypt, with tacit British approval.

Notes

References

1884 treaties
Treaties of the Khedivate of Egypt
Treaties of the Ethiopian Empire
Treaties of the United Kingdom
June 1884 events